Clarence McCall House, also known as the Harrison House, is a historic home located at Darlington, Darlington County, South Carolina.  It was built about 1904, and is a -story, frame Queen Anne style house.  It has shiplap siding, a high brick foundation, and a high hipped roof.  Also on the property is a small original barn with a gable roof and weatherboard siding.

It was listed on the National Register of Historic Places in 1988.

References

Houses on the National Register of Historic Places in South Carolina
Queen Anne architecture in South Carolina
Houses completed in 1904
Houses in Darlington County, South Carolina
National Register of Historic Places in Darlington County, South Carolina
Darlington, South Carolina